The 2010 Korean FA Cup, known as the 2010 Hana Bank FA Cup, was the 15th edition of the Korean FA Cup. It began on 6 March 2010, and ended on 24 October 2010. The champions Suwon Samsung Bluewings qualified for the 2011 AFC Champions League.

Schedule

Teams

Qualifying rounds

First round
The draw for the first round was held on 5 February 2010.

Second round
The draw for the second round was held on 10 March 2010.

Final rounds

Bracket

Round of 32
The draw for the round of 32 was held on 29 March 2010.

Round of 16
The draw for the round of 16 was held on 28 June 2010.

Quarter-finals
The draw for the quarter-finals was held on 29 July 2010.

Semi-finals
The draw for the semi-finals was held on 13 September 2010.

Final

Awards

Main awards
Source:

Man of the Round

See also
2010 in South Korean football
2010 K League
2010 Korea National League
2010 K3 League
2010 U-League
2010 Korean League Cup

References

External links
Official website
Fixtures & Results at KFA

2010
2010 in South Korean football
2010 domestic association football cups